Oscar Rennebohm (May 25, 1889 – October 15, 1968) was an American politician, a pharmacist, and the 32nd Governor of Wisconsin.  He previously served as lieutenant governor and assumed the office of governor in 1947 on the death of Governor Walter S. Goodland.

Early life
Born in Leeds, Wisconsin, in Columbia County, Rennebohm moved with his family to Milwaukee, Wisconsin, when he was ten. He graduated from the University of Wisconsin in 1911, after which he worked as a pharmacist and, in 1912, he founded Rennebohm Drug Stores under a Rexall franchise. He was vice-president of the American Pharmaceutical Association, president of the Wisconsin Pharmaceutical Association and a member of the Board of Regents of the University of Wisconsin.

Career
During World War I, he attended officer candidate school and was commissioned an Ensign in the United States Navy.

In 1945, Rennebohm was elected the 30th Lieutenant Governor of Wisconsin. When Governor Walter Goodland died shortly after his third term began, Rennebohm succeeded him, winning election to the governorship in 1948. During his tenure as governor, Rennebohm began a veterans' housing program financed by an increased liquor tax. In 1949, he founded the Rennebohm Foundation, which supports education in the Madison area. The school of pharmacy at the University of Wisconsin–Madison is named after Rennebohm.

Death
Rennebohm retired and died in Madison, Wisconsin, on October 15, 1968 (age 79 years, 143 days). He is interred at Forest Hill Cemetery, Madison, Wisconsin.

Family life
Son of William Carl and Julia Brandt Rennebohm, he married Mary Fowler on September 8, 1920, and they had one daughter, Carol Ann.

References

External links
 

1889 births
1968 deaths
People from Leeds, Wisconsin
University of Wisconsin–Madison alumni
Republican Party governors of Wisconsin
Lieutenant Governors of Wisconsin
United States Navy personnel of World War I
American Lutherans
American pharmacists
Military personnel from Wisconsin
20th-century American naval officers
20th-century American politicians
20th-century Lutherans